G. polymorpha may refer to:

 Gagea polymorpha, a spring lily
 Gigantopora polymorpha, a colonial invertebrate
 Gochnatia polymorpha, a South American tree
 Gracilanja polymorpha, an African moth
 Gregarina polymorpha, a parasitic protist
 Gyrtona polymorpha, an owlet moth